Surfbort is an American punk rock band formed in Brooklyn, New York in 2015. They were featured in a campaign by Gucci, and members of Blondie have named the band as a favorite of theirs. They have released music with Cult Records and Slope Records.

Biography

Surfbort was formed in 2014 by lead singer Dani Miller when she was at a gig looking for acts to perform. The group got their name from the Beyoncé song "Drunk in Love." They began releasing music with the single "Trash" in 2015, followed by their self-titled debut EP on Slope Records. 

Texan Sean Powell joined the band on drums in sept 2015. In Feb 2016 the original guitarist Matt Picola left the band and Powell asked fellow Texan Alex Kilgore to come in on guitar. 

In 2017, the band performed at the Coachella Festival. 

Their debut album Friendship Music was released in 2018 on Cult Records. 

In 2019, Surfbort was featured in Gucci's pre-fall campaign.

The band have toured Europe/UK/Australia twice and done several tours around the US and Canada. Among others they have played/toured with Idles, Interpol, Wolf Alice, Descendents, Amyl and the Sniffers, Black Lips, Tropical Fuckstorm, Iceage, and Starcrawler.

In 2020 Matt Picola rejoined the band and Nick Arnold was brought in to play bass. The current lineup is Dani Miller, Sean Powell, Alex Kilgore, Matt Picola, and Nick Arnold.

In 2021 the band recorded their 2nd full length Keep on Truckin’ with Linda Perry producing and now managing the band.

They are currently headlining a US tour and begin a headlining European tour in May.

Discography

Albums
 Friendship Music (October 26, 2018)
Keep On Truckin''' (Octoberish 2021)

EPs
 Surfbort 7" (January 20, 2016)
 Bort to Death (September 22, 2017)
 Billy (March 29, 2019)
 You Don't Exist (May 24, 2019)
 Apocalypse Care Package - DEMOS'' (May 1, 2020)

Singles
 "Trash" (September 30, 2015)
 "Les Be in Love" (February 14, 2018)
 "45" (June 12, 2018)
 "Pretty Little Fucker" (September 13, 2018)
 "Fetus" (September 14, 2018)
 "Trashworld" (September 27, 2018)
 "Slushy" (October 10, 2018)
 "Selfie" (October 25, 2018)
 "Billy" (February 15, 2019)
 "HOT ON THE SCENE" (October 16, 2019)
 "Silly D" (September 4, 2020)
 "Condom With No Cum" (November 6, 2020)

References

American punk rock groups
Punk rock groups from New York (state)
Cult Records artists